Oryza officinalis is species of flowering plant in the genus Oryza (rice) native to India, Nepal, the eastern Himalaya, southeast Asia, south-central and southeast China, Hainan, the Philippines, New Guinea, and the Northern Territory and Queensland in Australia. A perennial diploid with the CC rice genome, it can reach  in height. It is the namesake of a widespread species complex.

Pests
O. officinalis in Sukhothai Province, Thailand was reported in 1990 to be highly resistant to tungro and various other pests, and already in use in several cultivars.

References

officinalis
Plants described in 1891